Seasons of Change – The Complete Recordings 1970–1974 is a 3-CD box set collection of Australian band Fraternity, featuring Bon Scott on lead vocals. Released in 2021 by Cherry Red Records, this compilation includes the Fraternity albums, plus several unreleased recordings, alternate versions and rarities. This set includes the long lost Fraternity recordings which were held by their manager Hamish Henry and uncovered by music historian and promoter Victor Marshall.

Critical reception

Tracklist
CD 1
Livestock (3:39)
Somerville (4:22)
Raglan's Folly (6:02)
Cool Spot (4:53)
Grand Canyon Suites (4:53)
Jupiter's Landscape (2:47)
You Have a God (2:27)
It (8:28)
Why Did It Have to Be Me (2:39)
Question (3:37)     (Moody Blues cover)
Seasons of Change (single version) (3:36)    (Blackfeather cover) 
Somerville (single version) (3:49)   
The Race (pt 1) (2:56)     (Doug Ashdown cover)
The Race (pt 2) (4:12)     (Doug Ashdown cover)
CD 2
Welfare Boogie (3:41)
Annabelle (3:57)
Seasons of Change (album version) (3:53)        (Blackfeather cover)     
If You Got It (4:04)
You Have a God (alternate version) (3:10)
Hemming's Farm (3:48)
Raglan's Folly (alternate version) (4:41)
Getting Off (3:23)
Somerville R.I.P. (3:52)
Canyon Suite (7:28)
The Shape I'm In (3:38)    (The Band cover)  
If You Got It (single version) (3:52)
Raglan's Folly (single version) (3:54)
You Have a God (single version) (2:01)
Seasons of Change (Hoadley's Battle of the Sounds, live 1971) (2:39)   
If You Got It (Hoadley's Battle of the Sounds, live 1971) (2:00)
CD 3
Second Chance (3:18)  
Tiger (2:30)
Going Down (5:00)    (Moloch cover)
Requiem (4:51)
Patch of Land (3:29)
Cool Spot (alternate version) (6:00)
Hogwash (5:34)
Chest Fever (6:20)      (The Band cover)           
Little Queenie (4:57)       (Chuck Berry cover)
The Memory (3:59)
Just Another Whistle Stop (4:09)   (The Band cover)     
No Particular Place to Go (8:26)     (Chuck Berry cover)        
Livestock (2:36) (Vince Lovegrove with Fraternity, 1971)
Rented Room Blues (2:13) (Vince Lovegrove with Fraternity, 1971)
Get Myself Out of This Place (a.k.a. Getting Off) (3:20) (Vince Lovegrove with Fraternity, 1972)
That's Alright Momma (3:33) (Vince Lovegrove with Fraternity, 1972)   (Arthur Crudup cover)

Personnel
Bon Scott – lead vocals, recorder, chorus, percussions
Mick Jurd – lead guitar
Bruce Howe – bass guitar, lead vocals 
John Bisset – keyboards, lead vocals
Sam See – slide guitar, piano
"Uncle" John Eyers – harmonica, recorder
John Freeman – drums
Tony Buettel – drums
Mauri Berg – guitar

References

Fraternity (band) albums
2021 compilation albums
Cherry Red Records compilation albums